Bakerville is a rural unincorporated community in Humphreys County, Tennessee, United States. The community is several miles south of the county seat of Waverly and is near the confluence of the Buffalo and Duck Rivers.

History
It is believed that the town's name goes back to the Baker families that resided in the area during the 19th century. At one point, no fewer than 80 Bakers lived in the small town circa 1880.

Notable people
The first female senator in the United States, Hattie Caraway, was born here in 1878.

References

Unincorporated communities in Humphreys County, Tennessee
Unincorporated communities in Tennessee